Visa requirements for Micronesian citizens are administrative entry restrictions by the authorities of other states placed on citizens of the Federated States of Micronesia. As of 2 July 2019, Micronesian citizens had visa-free or visa on arrival access to 119 countries and territories, ranking the Micronesian passport 49th in terms of travel freedom (tied with Moldova) according to the Henley Passport Index.

Micronesia signed a mutual visa waiver agreement with Schengen Area countries on 20 September 2016.

Visa requirements map

Visa requirements

Dependent, Disputed, or Restricted territories
Unrecognized or partially recognized countries

Dependent and autonomous territories

See also
Visa policy of Micronesia
Micronesian passport

References and Notes
References

Notes

Micronesia
Politics of the Federated States of Micronesia